Bashmakovo is the name of several inhabited localities in Russia.

Urban localities
Bashmakovo, Penza Oblast, a work settlement in Bashmakovsky District of Penza Oblast

Rural localities
Bashmakovo, Kostroma Oblast, a village in Tsentralnoye Settlement of Buysky District of Kostroma Oblast
Bashmakovo, Oryol Oblast, a village in Alekhinsky Selsoviet of Khotynetsky District of Oryol Oblast
Bashmakovo, Pskov Oblast, a village in Nevelsky District of Pskov Oblast
Bashmakovo, Kalininsky District, Tver Oblast, a village in Kalininsky District, Tver Oblast
Bashmakovo, Staritsky District, Tver Oblast, a village in Staritsky District, Tver Oblast
Bashmakovo, Fakelsky Selsoviet, Igrinsky District, Udmurt Republic, a village in Fakelsky Selsoviet of Igrinsky District of the Udmurt Republic
Bashmakovo, Muzhbersky Selsoviet, Igrinsky District, Udmurt Republic, a village in Muzhbersky Selsoviet of Igrinsky District of the Udmurt Republic